Dickinson Dees LLP was a law firm of the United Kingdom that traded between 1975 and 2013.

At its peak in 2005 the firm had 763 solicitors (including partners). By 2010 the firm had reduced this number to 327 solicitors through restructuring. In 2012, the firm came last in a national survey of legal professionals conducted by Rollonfriday  

The firm had offices in Stockton on Tees, Leeds, Newcastle upon Tyne and London at the point it negotiated joining, Bristol based Bond Pearce. The successor firm was called Bond Dickinson and was headquartered in Bristol and then London. In November 2017, Bond Dickinson successfully negotiated joining an American law firm. The new firm is called Womble Bond Dickinson.

References

Defunct law firms of the United Kingdom
Law firms established in 1975
1975 establishments in the United Kingdom
2013 disestablishments in the United Kingdom
Law firms disestablished in 2013